The 2003 Clásica de Almería was the 18th edition of the Clásica de Almería cycle race and was held on 2 March 2003. The race was won by Luciano Pagliarini.

General classification

References

2003
Clásica de Almería